Ex Battalion (colloquially abbreviated as Ex B) is a Filipino hip hop collective from Muntinlupa City, Philippines, primarily known for their hit single "Hayaan Mo Sila" that went #2 on the Billboard Philippine Top 20. The group has numerous local hits that dominated Philippine social media and they are credited for "revolutionizing" Pinoy hip hop to a new modern sound. The hip-hop collective currently consists of Skusta Clee, Flow G, JRoa, Brando, Emcee Rhenn, and King Badger.  The group was founded by Honcho, who reportedly left the group in 2022.

To date, they have garnered a total of almost 2 billion views and over 5 million subscribers on YouTube. All members have also appeared in television and film, they starred in their first box-office feature "Sons of Nanay Sabel" in 2019, although it was not commercially successful.

History

2012-2016: Formation, early releases and rise to prominence 
In 2012, Ex Battalion was formed and founded by Bosx1ne (now known as Honcho), and rap battle emcees Jekkpot and Cent as a rap battle group, both of the latter left before their establishment as a music group but had joined several barangay rap battles before being into music. In January 2016, the group was formed into a musical group and as a hip hop collective and released their first album entitled "X" on digital platforms. They eventually recruited several artists to join their group after the release. The first three members were Bosx1ne, social media personality Jon Gutierrez (who performs under the mononym "King Badger") and Flow-G. Bosx1ne then invited former reality talent show participant JRoa and O.C. Dawgs member Skusta Clee to collaborate in their first track "Kakaiba" until eventually becoming members.

On 25 September 2016, three months after the release of their first smash-hit single, they released another single called "No Games". The track's music video was immediately uploaded on YouTube and subsequently garnering over 16 million views in a span of a just two months.

On 6 December 2016, they released "Tell Me" and the track's music video on YouTube. Social media personality Toni Fowler was featured on the video which helped the track to gain initial traction.

2017–2019: Peak popularity
In January 2017, the collective scored their first Billboard Philippine Top 20 hit as "No Games" entered the local chart and peaked at number 10 after several weeks.

However, on 7 November 2017, JRoa announced his intent to leave the group to focus on his solo musical career after releasing just one album in the label and appearing in several songs with the collective. Roa said that the group will still be the same "with or without him". Other members like Flow G and Bosx1ne accepted Roa's decision and pledged to support him on his future plans. Roa (which renamed and reverted as John Roa), joined Viva Records as a solo artist. On the same day, the group also released "Hayaan Mo Sila", inspired by DJ Khaled's "I'm the One".

On 3 January 2018, the official music video of "Hayaan Mo Sila" was taken down by YouTube after hitting almost twenty million views due to a copyright claim by the producer of the beat, Diamond Style, who claims that Ex Battalion only purchased a $25 lease which covers up to 2,000 streams and up to 250,000 views only. After the event, speculations swirled online regarding the alleged use of the beat without permission; Ex Battalion explained and admitted that they have not purchased the exclusive rights of the beat by which they only got from the producer's YouTube channel. After a few days, it was also removed from streaming services and digital stores. It was eventually restored in the stores including the music video on YouTube, after the issue was resolved two weeks later. Due to the massive attention, the track also rose up the charts, peaking at #2 on the Philippine Top 20. "Hayaan Mo Sila" was poised to be number one the following week after hitting #2. However, Billboard Philippines then ceased from publishing weekly charts.

On 12 March 2018, the collective released their new single entitled "SouthBoys" on YouTube in another collaboration with O.C. Dawgs. Special appearances in the video included Huddass, Jnske, and Bullet-D. All of which are from O.C. Dawgs. The video became the number 1 trend in the YouTube PH platform several hours after the upload. On 13 March 2018, it was announced that the collective will be handled and managed by Filipino comedian Ai-Ai delas Alas, who they previously collaborated with in the track entitled "Walang Pinipili" (lit. Choosing Nobody), after signing a management contract.

On early 2019, Delas Alas resigned as the group's manager. Delas Alas reasoned her inability to handle the ego of certain members who are "behaving unprofessionally". After Ex Battalion starred in their first box-office film, Sons of Nanay Sabel in May 2019, it was reported that Bosx1ne announced his separation from the group on 9 May 2019, citing personal reasons in an apparent publicity stunt for their movie. However, Bosx1ne remaining with the collective was confirmed when he still appeared with his own verse in the music video of their single entitled "Pakinabang" which they released on 5 August 2019. Bosx1ne changed his screen name to Honcho in mid-2020.

Outside music, Flow G launched a business venture "Brand for 199x" & has released a track named "Deym" with a video advertisement, involving Skusta Clee as an ambassador of the brand. After the upload, Netizens slamed the two members for allegedly plagiarizing the song "Ddaeng" by BTS, released on SoundCloud in 2018, and have made #SkustaCleeisGoingtoJailParty a trending topic on Philippine Twitter. However, a few weeks later, the group's management denied allegations and stated that the two pieces are 'inherently different' and claimed that they used a generic triplet flow. The management also added that "There will be no jail time involved even if there is a conviction of copyright infringement".

2020–present: JRoa's return to the group and Post-Honcho era
On 14 December 2020, after being spotted hanging out with the group again after a long time, John Roa (or simply JRoa) released his new single "Woah" under Ex Battalion Music and Viva Records.

On 4 February 2021, Flow G teamed up with Gloc-9's talent management Asintada.

On April 2021, Honcho announced a lenten special EP titled "Rosario", which he would be releasing on YouTube one track a day from 1 to 4 April, starting with the first song entitled "Ulap" featuring Jekkpot, Brando, and MC Einstein.

On 5 April 2021, the collective released their new single entitled "Yearly" on YouTube with special appearances of the sub-members in the video included Jekkpot, Yuri Dope, MC Einstein, Huddass, and E.I.J., the collaborative track is produced by Flip-D and Thyro Alfaro. OneMusicPH described it as "a piercing and elaborately structured diss track."

On November 2021, the group announced that they will be holding their first major stage concert at Smart Araneta Coliseum, with the whole collective performing including sub-members from the Ex Battalion Music label, their first show is entitled "EVOLUXION".

On August 2022, rumors sparked about Honcho's member status after Ex Battalion released their new track "Chismis", with the lyrics clearly referencing the group's founder Honcho being ousted from the group. It was reported that Honcho allegedly punched  fellow member Skusta Clee after an altercation about transparency with their earnings. After the incident, Skusta Clee announced that "the group is still complete" in a cryptic post with a photo of all members without their founder, indicating Honcho has left the group. Since then, Honcho has released solo work on his own after succeeding releases by Ex Battalion without him. Although, no member has spoken up confirming the issues and there were no legal action taken to court regarding the matter from anyone in both parties.

Members
Current members
 Skusta Clee – rapper, vocalist
 Flow G – rapper, vocalist
 JRoa – vocalist 
 Brando – rapper
 Emcee Rhenn – rapper
 King Badger – rapper
Former members
Honcho (status disputed since 2022)– founder, rapper

Discography

Singles

As a lead artist

Albums

Extended plays

Charts

Filmography

Films

Television
 ExB Rules! (Under GMA ONE: ONline Exclusives), 2018
 Kapuso Mo, Jessica Soho, 2018
 Celebrity Bluff, 2018
 Magpakailanman, 2018
 iJuander, 2018
 Daig Kayo Ng Lola Ko, 2018
 Inday Will Always Love You, 2018
 My Guitar Princess, 2018
 Victor Magtanggol, 2018
 Daddy's Gurl, 2019
 Studio 7, 2019
 Eat Bulaga'', 2020

Awards and nominations

References

Filipino hip hop groups
Hip hop collectives
Musical groups established in 2016
Musical groups from Metro Manila
2016 establishments in the Philippines
GMA Network personalities